Shawn Foreman (born June 3, 1975) is a former American football Wide receiver. He played college football at West Virginia.

In his career, Foreman has played for the New York Jets, the Oklahoma Wranglers, the Indiana Firebirds, and the Grand Rapids Rampage.

High school career
Foreman attended Indian River High School in Chesapeake, Virginia. While there, he was a First-team All-City, All-County, All-Area & All-Tidewater Conference choice as a wide receiver, and also Class AAA All-Virginia honors. Foreman caught a record 62 passes for 1,008 yards as a senior. He was also a standout baseball & basketball player. In 1995 Foreman decided that he wanted to be a school teacher.

College career
While at West Virginia, Foreman majored in Child Development and Family Studies. He was a member of the Athletic Director's Academic Honor Roll and he was also a recipient of the Gail W. Cunningham endowed scholarship.

In 1995 as a freshman, Foreman was a back-up strong safety until switching to Flanker for the last month of the season. He recorded 15 tackles (six solos) with a fumble recovery. In three games on offense, he caught four passes for 56 yards.

Against Virginia Tech, Foreman recorded a blocked punt which he recovered, and recorded four tackles. Against Rutgers, Foreman played both offense and defense, recording one reception for five yards, and three tackles. In the Backyard Brawl, Foreman recorded a season-long 23-yard reception.

In 1996 as a sophomore, Foreman appeared in every game of the season as a back-up wide receiver. He finished the season with 25 catches for 415 yards a 16.6 yards per reception average and three touchdowns. He also served as a back-up strong safety, recording six tackles (two solos).

Against Rutgers, he recorded two touchdown receptions, 23 and 48-yards, as well as six catches for 164 yards.

In 1997 as a junior, Foreman was an All-Big East First-team selection. He led the conference and set a school single-season record with 77 receptions, for 928 yards averaging 12.1 yards per reception, (third-best season total in WVU history) and five touchdowns.

Against Georgia Tech, he recorded 12 receptions, tying a school record, for 110 yards in the Carquest Bowl.

While being a year away from his degree, Foreman said, that he would possibly go to graduate school, and that if the NFL did not interfere, that he had his heart set on going back to school, as an elementary school teacher.

In 1998 as a senior, Foreman was an All-Big East First-team selection once again. He received the Iron Mountaineer Award as the top performer in the winter workout program. He served as an offensive co-captain for the Mountaineers. He started every game of the season at flanker, finishing second on the team with 63 receptions for 948 yards, a 15.0 yards per reception average, and eight touchdowns. Only David Saunders (1,043 in 1996) gained more yards receiving in a single-season for the Mountaineers. Foreman also recorded two tackles.

Against Missouri in the Insight.com Bowl, he ended his college career with a career-high 11 receptions for 189 yards. His 11 receptions ranked fifth on the school’s record books and his 189 yards ranked sixth.

Career statistics

Foremnas 169 career receptions rank second on the West Virginia all-time receptions list. His 2,347 receiving yards ranks third on the West Virginia all-time receiving yardage list. Foreman's 16 career touchdown receptions is tied for seventh best on the West Virginia all-time touchdown receptions list.

Professional career

National Football League (1999)
Foreman went unselected in the 1999 NFL Draft, though he later signed with the New York Jets on April 20. However, he failed to make the team and was later released. He was out of football in 2000.

Arena Football League (2001–2004)

Oklahoma Wranglers (2001)
In 2001, Foreman entered the Arena Football League with the Oklahoma Wranglers. During his rookie season, he finished third on the team in receiving. For the season, he recorded 33 receptions for 406 yards and nine touchdowns. He also finished third on defense, with 24.5 tackles, one pass break up, two forced fumbles, one fumble recovery, and one interception.

Dallas Desperados
Foreman signed with the Dallas Desperados for 2002. He was waived on March 25, 2002.

Indiana Firebirds (2002–2003)
On April 12, 2002, Foreman was signed by the Indiana Firebirds. For the season, he finished eight on the team in receiving, only playing in four game. He had five receptions for 29 yards. He also, finished fourth on the team in defense, recording 36 tackles, one pass break up, one fumble recovery, and one interception for 16 yards.

In 2003, Foreman finished 10th on the team in receiving. For the season he recorded five receptions for 78 yards, and three touchdowns. He also finished fifth on the team in defense, recording 41.5 tackles, one pass broken up, one forced fumble, one fumble recovery, and three interceptions for 21 yards, and once again only playing in four games.

In 2004 Foreman joined the Grand Rapids Rampage, he finished sixth on the team in receiving. He recorded 25 receptions for 296 yards, and six touchdowns. He also finished 12th on the team in defense, recording 15 tackles, one pass broken up, one forced fumble, one fumble recovery, and one interception.

During his last appearance of the season, and subsequently his career, week 14 against the Chicago Rush, Foreman recorded one reception for 18 yards.

Career statistics

Notes

External links
 College profile at CBSSports.com

1975 births
Living people
Sportspeople from Chesapeake, Virginia
American football wide receivers
American football linebackers
West Virginia Mountaineers football players
New York Jets players
Oklahoma Wranglers players
Indiana Firebirds players
Grand Rapids Rampage players
Dallas Desperados players